Dallin Leavitt (born August 8, 1994) is an American football strong safety who is a free agent. He played college football at BYU and Utah State.

Early life and high school
Leavitt grew up in Portland, Oregon and initially attended Westview High School before transferring to Central Catholic High School. He was a standout defensive back for the Rams and was considered a top collegiate prospect. He ultimately committed to Brigham Young University during his second year of high school over offers from Stanford, Oregon, and UCLA. He was named Oregon School Activities Association first-team all-state  and was tabbed the 6A co-Defensive Player of the Year during his senior season.

College career

BYU
Leavitt began his college career at Brigham Young University. He played two seasons for the Cougars, appearing in 24 games and starting five. As a sophomore, he recorded 43 tackles, including 3.5 for a loss, 1.5 sacks, and two passes defensed in 11 games (four starts). Leavitt announced that he would be transferring to Utah State University at the end of his sophomore season.

Utah State
After sitting out a season due to NCAA transfer rules, Leavitt played for the Aggies for his final two seasons of eligibility. He appeared in 21 games, all starts, and recorded 151 tackles, including 2.5 for loss, with seven interceptions and six pass breakups. In his senior season, Leavitt started all 13 games and made 94 tackles (2nd on the team), 1 tackle for loss, four interceptions and five pass breakups and was named honorable mention All-Mountain West Conference.
 In total, Leavitt appeared in 45 games (26 starts) and accumulated 211 tackles, seven interceptions, eight pass breakups and 1.5 sacks over the course of his collegiate career.

Professional career

Oakland / Las Vegas Raiders
Leavitt signed with the Oakland Raiders as an undrafted free agent on May 14, 2018, after participating in a rookie minicamp on a tryout basis. He was cut by the Raiders at the end of training camp and subsequently re-signed to the team's practice squad on September 2, 2018. Leavitt was promoted to the Raiders' active roster on December 24, 2018, before the team's Monday night game against the Denver Broncos after an injury to cornerback Daryl Worley. Leavitt made his NFL debut that night in the Raiders' 27–14 win, playing 12 snaps on special teams and making a tackle.

Leavitt made the Raiders' 53-man roster out of training camp for the 2019 season. He played in 15 games, mostly on special teams, and made 10 total tackles.

Leavitt re-signed on a one-year contract with the Raiders on April 16, 2020. He was waived on September 15, 2020, and re-signed to the practice squad two days later. He was promoted back to the active roster on October 2, 2020.

Leavitt signed a one-year contract extension with the Raiders on March 8, 2021. He was released on July 20, 2022.

Green Bay Packers
On July 25, 2022, Leavitt was signed by the Green Bay Packers.

Personal life
Leavitt's father, Jared, played linebacker for BYU from 1980 to 1984. Leavitt is an Eagle Scout. His wife Josie, is a former Utah State soccer player.

References

External links
Green Bay Packers bio
BYU Cougars bio
Utah State Aggies bio

1994 births
Living people
Players of American football from Portland, Oregon
American football defensive backs
Central Catholic High School (Portland, Oregon) alumni
BYU Cougars football players
Utah State Aggies football players
Oakland Raiders players
Las Vegas Raiders players
Green Bay Packers players